Ramamangalam  is a village in Ernakulam district in the Indian state of Kerala, it lies between Kolenchery,  Piravom and Muvattupuzha towns. This small town lies in the Muvattupuzha taluk.

Demographics
 India census, Ramamangalam had a population of 9999 with 5070 males and 4929 females.

Location

Notable people 
E. P. Poulose (1909–1983), politician

References

Villages in Ernakulam district